Yuriy Mykolayovych Kalitvintsev (born 5 May 1968) is a football manager and former player who manages Polissya Zhytomyr.

Born in Russia, Kalitvintsev became a naturalized Ukrainian after a spell with Dynamo Kyiv and represented the Ukraine national team.

Kalitvintsev coached Ukraine U-19 to victory during the 2009 UEFA European Under-19 Football Championship. 

His son Vladyslav is also a player, a midfielder for FC Desna Chernihiv.

Club career
A Russian-born Kalitvintsev chose to play for the Ukraine side after breaking through as a midfielder for Dynamo Kyiv. Until 1994 he played he spent his playing career at Russian clubs such as FC Rotor Volgograd, FC SKA Rostov-on-Don, FC Dynamo Moscow, and FC Lokomotiv Nizhny Novgorod. It wasn't until the reorganization of the soviet football when he started to play at the top level of the Russian championship starting for the Moscow's Dynamo. After being transferred to the fading club of Nizhniy Novgorod soon he was offered opportunity from the Ukrainian football giant, Dynamo, which he did not refuse playing alongside such players as Andriy Shevchenko, Serhii Rebrov, Vitaliy Kosovskyi, and others. His playmaking abilities during the late 1990s were particularly useful during his partnership with Serhii Rebrov and Andriy Shevchenko on both the club and national team level where he earned an honorary position of a team captain. Kalitvintsev was named Ukrainian Footballer of the Year in 1995. In 1998, Kalitvintsev earned a paid transfer to play for Trabzonspor in Turkey, returning to play for CSKA Kyiv to finish his playing career in 2000.

International career

Kalitvintsev earned 22 caps for the Ukraine national team. He scored one goal, a very important one against the group favorites, Croatia, at Republican Stadium in Kyiv on 11 June 1995 during qualification to the Euro 1996.

Coaching career
Following his retirement, Kalitvintsev coached FC Zakarpattia Uzhhorod for several years. He was the coach of FC Dynamo-2 Kyiv in 2006–10. In January 2013 Kalitvintsev was appointed the head coach of FC Volga Nizhny Novgorod returning to Nizhniy Novgorod after almost 20 years when he played for Lokomotiv Nizhniy Novgorod.

Kalitvintsev was a coach of several junior Ukraine national football teams that played in tournaments for U-19 and U-17 players. 
Kalitvintsev was appointed as assistant of head coach Myron Markevych of Ukraine's national football team early February 2010. After Markevych's resignation of late August 2010 Kalitvintsev was appointed Ukraine's caretaker manager on 25 August 2010. On 21 April 2011, Oleh Blokhin was appointed head coach of the Ukraine national team; Kalitvintsev stayed on as Blokhin's assistant.

Kalitvintsev was appointed manager of Russian Premier League team FC Dynamo Moscow.

Career statistics

International goals
Scores and results list Ukraine's goal tally first, score column indicates score after each Kalitvintsev goal.

Honours

As Player
Dynamo Kyiv
 Ukrainian Premier League: 1994–95, 1995–96, 1996–97, 1997–98
 Ukrainian Cup: 1995–96, 1997–98
 Commonwealth of Independent States Cup: 1997, 1998

Rotor Volgograd
Soviet/Russian First League: 1991 

Individual
 Ukrainian Premier League Footballer of the Year: 1995

As Coach
Dynamo Moscow
 Russian Football National League: 2016–17

Ukraine U19
 UEFA European Under-19 Championship: 2009

References

External links
 
 
 
 Short biography at legioner.kulichki.ru 
 
 

1968 births
Living people
Sportspeople from Volgograd
Association football midfielders
Soviet footballers
Ukrainian footballers
Russian footballers
Ukrainian expatriate footballers
Ukraine international footballers
FC Dynamo Kyiv players
FC Dynamo-2 Kyiv players
FC Dynamo-3 Kyiv players
FC Rotor Volgograd players
FC Dynamo Moscow players
FC Dynamo Moscow reserves players
FC SKA Rostov-on-Don players
Trabzonspor footballers
FC Lokomotiv Nizhny Novgorod players
FC Arsenal Kyiv players
Soviet Top League players
Soviet First League players
Ukrainian Premier League players
Ukrainian First League players
Ukrainian Second League players
Russian Premier League players
Russian Second League players
Russian Amateur Football League players
Süper Lig players
Expatriate footballers in Turkey
Ukrainian expatriate sportspeople in Turkey
Ukrainian people of Russian descent
Russian emigrants to Ukraine
Naturalized citizens of Ukraine
FC Hoverla Uzhhorod managers
Ukraine national football team managers
FC Dynamo-2 Kyiv managers
Russian Premier League managers
Russian First League managers
Ukrainian Premier League managers
Ukrainian First League managers
FC Volga Nizhny Novgorod managers
Ukrainian football managers
Ukrainian expatriate football managers
Ukrainian expatriate sportspeople in Russia
FC Dynamo Moscow managers
Expatriate football managers in Russia
FC Olimpik Donetsk managers
FC Polissya Zhytomyr managers